Pete Brady (born 1941) is a Canadian radio presenter, television presenter and company director who has worked in the United Kingdom for over 50 years. He was one of the original lineup of disc jockeys on the pirate radio station Radio London as well as BBC Radio 1 and was one of the original presenters of Magpie. He retired early from broadcasting to set up Clearwater Communications, a group of companies specialising in the production of major corporate events around the world.  He was diagnosed with tongue and kidney cancer in 2015 and is now concentrating on helping others who have been diagnosed and treated for Head and Neck cancers.

Brady was born in Montreal and was heavily involved in radio during his teen years. He first joined Radio Jamaica as a stand-in presenter. In 1962, he moved to the UK, worked as an assistant producer on television commercials and in 1964 became the first voice on the pirate station Radio London, where he fronted the breakfast show. In 1965, he went freelance, and in 1966 he joined the Light Programme where he was heard presenting the daily afternoon show Midday Spin; at the same time he also hosted a record review show on Radio Luxembourg.

Following a similar path to DJs Tony Blackburn, Kenny Everett and Simon Dee, he made the natural progression to BBC Radio 1 at its launch in September 1967. Brady was given a major six-day-a-week afternoon slot Monday to Saturdays. He played a varied mix of current pop and rock music, new releases as well as big band, jazz and instrumental music. The second half of the show was also carried on BBC Radio 2.

In July 1968, he became one of the original presenters of Thames Television's new children's magazine programme, Magpie. He continued with Magpie until 1971, when he returned to radio for a short time before setting up his own production company. This enterprise grew over the years and became the Clearwater Communications Group which included Business Meetings Ltd and Crystal Clear Film and Video.

At the beginning of 2015 he was diagnosed with base of tongue cancer and a few months later with kidney cancer.  His treatment for the former ended in October that year and he had part of one kidney removed in November.

Following his recovery he now spends his free time running Heads2gether, the Head and Neck Cancer support group dedicated to helping head and neck cancer patients that have just been diagnosed with cancer or are in treatment and facilitating group meetings for those that have completed their treatment. His overriding aim is to raise awareness of Head and Neck cancer by the general public. To this end, he currently hosts a breakfast show on 4legs Radio, an online community radio station in the Lambourn Valley.
   
Brady was married to show jumper Judith Humble in 1966.  He is now married to Miranda Pearce and currently lives in Berkshire.

External links
 Pete Brady at Radio Rewind
 

1941 births
Living people
People from Montreal
Canadian radio hosts
Canadian television hosts
BBC television presenters
BBC Radio 1 presenters
Radio Luxembourg (English) presenters
Offshore radio broadcasters
Pirate radio personalities